Cosmopolitan Girl is a single by Puerto Rican boy band, Menudo released in 1993 on McGillis Records.
It features Abel Talamántez, Alexis Grullón, Andy Blázquez, Ashley Ruiz and Ricky López.

Track listing
Radio Mix [4:02]
Club Mix [5:05]
Rave Mix [7:58]
A Cappella Mix [4:18]
Extended Pop Mix [5:35]
Reggae Mix [3:10]

References

 

1993 albums
Menudo (band) albums